Seal script, also sigillary script is an ancient style of writing Chinese characters that was common throughout the latter half of the 1st millennium BC. It evolved organically out of the Zhou dynasty bronze script. The Qin variant of seal script eventually became the standard, and was adopted as the formal script for all of China during the Qin dynasty. It was still widely used for decorative engraving and seals (name chops, or signets) in the Han dynasty.

Types 
The general term seal script can be used to refer to several types of seal script, including the large or great seal script (Japanese ; Korean ; Vietnamese ) and the lesser or small seal script (Japanese ; Korean ; Vietnamese ). Most commonly, without any other clarifying terminology, it refers to the latter of these. The term large seal script itself can also cover a broad variety of scripts, including a variation of Qin writing earlier than the small seal characters, but also the earlier Western Zhou forms, or even oracle bone characters as well. Since the term is an imprecise one, not clearly referring to any specific historical script and not used with any consensus in meaning, modern scholars tend to avoid it, and when referring to seal script, generally mean the (small) seal script of the Qin system, that is, the lineage which evolved in the state of Qin during the Spring and Autumn and Warring States period and which was standardized under the First Emperor.

Development
There were several different variants of seal script which developed independently in each kingdom during the Spring and Autumn and Warring States periods. One of these, the "bird-worm" seal script, is named for its intricate decorations on the defining strokes, and was used in the Kingdoms of Wu, Chu, and Yue. It was found on several artifacts including the Spear of Fuchai and the Sword of Goujian. This seal script variant is very difficult to read.

As a southern state, Chu was close to the Wu-Yue influences. Chu produced broad bronze swords that were similar to Wuyue swords, but not as intricate. Chu also used the bird-worm style, which was borrowed by the Wu and Yue states.

Unified small seal script

The script of the Qin system (the writing as exemplified in bronze inscriptions in the state of Qin before unification) had evolved organically from the Zhou script starting in the Spring and Autumn period. Beginning around the Warring States period, it became vertically elongated with a regular appearance. This was the period of maturation of the small seal script. It was systematized by prime minister Li Si during the reign of the First Emperor of China Qin Shi Huang through elimination of most variant structures, and was imposed as the nationwide standard. Their form is characterized by being less rectangular and more squarish.

In the popular history of Chinese characters, the small seal script is traditionally considered to be the ancestor of the clerical script, which in turn gave rise to all of the other scripts in use today. However, recent archaeological discoveries and scholarship have led some scholars to conclude that the direct ancestor of clerical script was proto-clerical script, which in turn evolved out of the little-known vulgar or popular writing of the late Warring States to Qin period.

The first known character dictionary was the 3rd century BC , collated and referenced by Liu Xiang and his son Liu Xin. It is no longer extant. Its 9,353 entries reproduce the standardized small-seal script variant for each entry, and for some entries other pre-Han variants from the late Zhou era. Entries are categorized under 540 section headers.

Computer encoding

It has been anticipated that the small seal script will some day be encoded in Unicode. Codepoints U+32400 to U+352FF (Plane 3, Tertiary Ideographic Plane) have been tentatively allocated.

See also 
 Old Texts
 'Phags-pa (Mongolian "Seal" script)

References

Citations

Sources

External links 

 Qin Yun Song, Big Seal Script Banner
 Script translation
 Richard Sears on seal script

 

Chinese characters
Chinese heraldry
Chinese script style
Chinese seal art
Logographic writing systems
Seals (insignia)
Writing systems